Kazimierzewo may refer to the following places:
Kazimierzewo, Greater Poland Voivodeship (west-central Poland)
Kazimierzewo, Nakło County in Kuyavian-Pomeranian Voivodeship (north-central Poland)
Kazimierzewo, Toruń County in Kuyavian-Pomeranian Voivodeship (north-central Poland)
Kazimierzewo, Warmian-Masurian Voivodeship (north Poland)